In relational algebra, a rename is a unary operation written as  where:

  is a relation
  is an attribute of 

Formally, the semantics of the rename operator is defined as follows:

 

 

Relational algebra